Jo Phoenix (born 1964) is an author and  professor of Criminology in the UK. Phoenix writes about the policies and laws which surround various sexual activities, and the social conditions which underpin them. She is known for her "gender critical" views, having founded the Gender Critical Research Network, and has sued her employer after they refused to act when her colleagues subjected her to sustained harassment and bullying.

Career 
Phoenix has held academic posts as Lecturer in Criminology at the University of Middlesex from 1998 - 2000, at  University of Bath until 2000 and a variety of posts at University of Durham until 2013 (Reader in Criminology, made Professor in 2010, Deputy Head of the Faculty of Social Sciences and Health,  Dean of Queens Campus) and Head of Law Department at University of Leicester. She was Professor of Criminology at the Open University, before moving to University of Reading.  Phoenix is a trustee of the Centre for Crime and Justice Studies.

Her research areas include sex, gender, sexualities, prostitution policy and the experience of women in prison. She has written two books,  Making Sense of Prostitution and  Illegal and Illicit: Sex, Regulation and Social Control ( with Susan Oerton). Phoenix edited  Regulating Sex for Sale and several articles and book chapters on the sex industry  and experiences of supporting transgender persons in the prison estate.

Reviewers of her books describe "the paradox that cannot have escaped the attention of many readers in the field: that the apparent increase in freedom, choice, and diversity in sexual matters is conversely and simultaneously matched by a ‘proliferation of laws, policies and guidelines which seek to determine the complex, vast and ever-increasing rules of engagement" Phoenix gave evidence to the UK Parliament regarding the multiple disadvantages that women experience in the criminal justice system, particularly working class women and women of colour. In relation to community-based punishments and services, she lobbied for continued provision of women-only, single sex spaces for women.

Freedom of speech 
She is one of the two academic speakers (along with Rosa Freedman) who received an apology from University of Essex in 2021 after their invitation to speak was withdrawn at short notice. In November 2021, Phoenix welcomed legal action against the University of Essex, claiming its policies breach free speech legislation. The Free Speech Union, led by Toby Young, took the action. An investigation found the decision to withdraw the invitation "amounted to a breach of Prof Phoenix's right to freedom of expression".

In 2021 she began a process of suing the Open University (her employer) for not protecting her against harassment in the workplace. She has stated that she hopes the "case will help to establish a line in the sand and make it clear that baseless accusations of transphobia simply for standing up for the rights of women is harassment especially when made in an academic context". She left the Open University to take up a professorial role at University of Reading in the School of Law.

Gender Critical Research Network 
In June 2021, Phoenix and Jon Pike (a researcher in Philosophy of Sport)  convened the Gender Critical Research Network (GCRN) at the Open University. The network aims to  "bring together a range of academics and scholars, all of which share a common interest in exploring how sexed bodies come to matter in their respective research fields and a common commitment to ensuring that a space within academia is kept open for those explorations". Philosopher Kathleen Stock and Historian Selina Todd are members.

The network was criticised in an open letter signed by 380 people, which called on the Open University to withhold support and funding. The letter said the network was "hostile to the rights of trans people" and said that academic freedom should not be "at the expense of marginalised groups". Phoenix has stated formally that  she supports  "the rights of trans individuals to be fully protected by the Equalities Act and welcome government reform of the Gender Recognition Act in ways that are sympathetic to their needs" but proposes that an individual’s right to identify as a particular gender should  not be the basis upon which provision of criminal justice is based.

The Open University's Vice-Chancellor's Executive found that "the formation of the GCRN was compatible with academic freedom, while also acknowledging that some staff found the content of the group's work to be challenging or concerning” and undertook a review of its policies and procedures.

References 

Living people
British women academics
Women legal scholars
1964 births
Academics of Durham University
People associated with the Open University
British criminologists
British women criminologists
British women writers